August Henkel (1880–1961) was an American artist.

He was a Socialist candidate for 4th District of the New York State Assembly from Queens County in 1919, and Communist candidate for the 1st District of the House of Representatives from New York in 1934.

He was a member of the Federal Art Project, and worked on a mural at Floyd Bennett Field with Eugene Chodorow. There was a controversy about Joseph Stalin appearing in the mural. In 1940, he refused to sign a loyalty oath, resulting in the destruction of the mural.

References

External links

August Henkel in 1939
August Henkel case
Comment on controversy in the New Yorker, July 20, 1940
August Henkel, at Ask Art

1880 births
1961 deaths
Federal Art Project artists
Communist Party USA politicians
Artists from New York City